Matthew Charles Paterson (died January 26, 1846) was an American lawyer and politician from New York.

Life
He graduated A.M. from Columbia College in 1819.

In 1840, he delivered An Address on Primary Education (42 pages) before the Columbia Peithologian Society.

He was New York County District Attorney from June 1844 until his death in January 1846.

Sources
The New York Civil List compiled by Franklin Benjamin Hough (page 377; Weed, Parsons and Co., 1858)
Death notice in The Golden Rule (issue of January 31, 1846; page 78)

Date of birth unknown
1846 deaths
New York County District Attorneys
Columbia College (New York) alumni